Lyng is a village and civil parish in the English county of Norfolk.

The village's name is likely derived from the Old English wordhlinc', meaning 'bank', 'ledge', or 'terrace'.

For the purposes of local government, the parish falls within the Elmham and Mattishall division of Norfolk County Council and the Upper Wensum ward of Breckland District Council.

St. Margaret's Church and The Fox public house are located closer to the river with Lyng Stores and Tea Room located centrally in the village.

Churches

In medieval times, Lyng had two churches. St. Edmund's Chapel was the church of a Benedictine nunnery at Lyng Eastaugh, three quarters of a mile to the south-east of the village. It fell into ruin after being abandoned in the 13th century and all but a small stone pillar has disappeared.

Clergyman and poet Ralph Knevet became rector of Lyng in 1652, and remained there for the rest of his life. He died in 1671 and was buried in the chancel of St. Margaret's Church. Charles Anson was another rector of Lyng from 1794.

The church of St Margaret is still in use today and has regular services operated by the Church Of England. Externally, the church appears to be 17th to 18th century, due to a large renovation that took place around that time. The nave dates from the 15th century, when it was most probably enlarged from the original medieval church which stood there. Lyng St Margaret also houses an altar cloth which was made in the 19th century from at least two 15th-century vestments.

Other features

Lyng also has a motocross track located to the south of the village called Cadders Hill, run by the Norwich Vikings motorcycle club. The club holds the British Motocross Championship, Eastern Centre Championship, and other events annually. The track is situated in a natural valley with Cadders Hill and the surrounding woodland as its main feature.

Lyng had a mill house on the River Wensum built for milling flour, but later operated for both paper and flour. It ceased working in 1868.

Like many villages in Norfolk, Lyng is surrounded by farmland. In 1999, Greenpeace activists, including The Lord Melchett, destroyed 6 acres of genetically modified maize in Lyng as a form of civil disobedience.

Eastaugh
The hamlet of Eastaugh or Easthaugh, often known as Lyng Eastaugh, lies to the south-east of the main village near Weston Longville. It is the site of the ruin of the medieval chapel of St Edmund's.

References

External links

Information from Genuki Norfolk on Lyng.

Villages in Norfolk
Civil parishes in Norfolk
Breckland District